IRAS 04509-6922 is a red supergiant star or red hypergiant in the Large Magellanic Cloud. It is one of the largest stars, with a size of nearly 1400 solar radii. If placed in the Solar System, its photosphere would engulf the orbit of Jupiter. This star has a low metallicity. This is a Mira-type variable star currently on the asymptotic giant branch and shrouded in dust.

References 

M-type supergiants
Dorado (constellation)
Stars in the Large Magellanic Cloud
TIC objects